Rhinomonas is a genus of cryptophytes.

It includes the species Rhinomonas pauca.

References

Cryptomonad genera